The Vagabond is a 1916 American silent romantic comedy film by Charlie Chaplin and his third film with Mutual Films. Released to theaters on July 10, 1916, it co-starred Edna Purviance, Eric Campbell, Leo White and Lloyd Bacon. This film echoed Chaplin's work on The Tramp, with more drama and pathos mixed in with the comedy.

Synopsis 
The story begins with Charlie, the Tramp, arriving at a bar, playing on a violin to raise money and exciting a rivalry with competing musicians. This results in a barroom brawl and comic mayhem.

Wandering off into the vicinity of a gypsy caravan in the country, he encounters the beautiful, though bedraggled, Edna. He entertains her with his violin. She has been abducted and abused by the gypsies, chief among them Eric Campbell, who whips her mercilessly. Charlie comes to her rescue and knocks her tormentors over the head with a stick before riding off with her in a commandeered cart. Love develops between them as Charlie washes Edna's face in a bowl and combs her hair. He makes breakfast while she goes to fetch water. On the way Edna meets an artist who lacks inspiration. Edna is his muse and he paints her, including her unique shamrock-shaped birthmark. Edna falls for him and brings him back to the cart where the two talk, while Charlie is ignored. The artist leaves and she is stuck with Charlie.

The resulting painting is seen by the girl's mother who recognizes the unusual birthmark and rushes with the artist to rescue her daughter. They find her with Charlie, who refuses payment from the mother and sadly says goodbye. Edna is driven off in a limousine with her mother, others, and the artist—only to realize she loves Charlie. She orders the car to reverse and take him along with her.

Reception 
Louis Reeves Harrison wrote in The Moving Picture World, "The latter part of this story shows Chaplin in a new role, and he handles it well in spite of the necessity of being as funny as possible. He would make an interesting lead in almost any story if it were possible for him to divest himself of the little tricks which have made him famous. Those little tricks still go, and they pay, but it would be a novelty to see Chaplin free to do without them in some opportunity of a reverse, or much different, character."

The film was briefly discussed in Motion Picture Magazine, where it was described as "Almost a comedy-drama, in which heart interest mixes well with broad farce. Edna Purviance, as the 'stolen child,' is an excellent support."

Cast 
Charles Chaplin as Saloon Violinist
 Edna Purviance as Gypsy Drudge
 Eric Campbell as Gypsy Chieftain
 Leo White as Old Jew/Gypsy Woman
 Lloyd Bacon as Artist and Gypsy
 Charlotte Mineau as Girl's Mother
 Albert Austin as Trombonist
 John Rand as Trumpeter, Band Leader
 James T. Kelley as Gypsy and Musician
 Frank J. Coleman as Gypsy and Musician
 Phyllis Allen (uncredited)
 Henry Bergman (uncredited)
 Fred Goodwins Percussionist / Gypsy (uncredited)

Sound version 

In 1932, Amedee Van Beuren of Van Beuren Studios, purchased Chaplin's Mutual comedies for $10,000 each, added music by Gene Rodemich and Winston Sharples and sound effects, and re-released them through RKO Radio Pictures. Chaplin had no legal recourse to stop the RKO release.

See also 
The Circus (1928)
Charlie Chaplin filmography

References

External links 

 (incomplete!)

1916 comedy films
1916 short films
1916 films
American black-and-white films
Silent American comedy films
American silent short films
Articles containing video clips
American comedy short films
Mutual Film films
Short films directed by Charlie Chaplin
Films about Romani people
1910s American films